Joan Kee is an art historian specializing in modern and contemporary art. Her book, Contemporary Korean Art: Tansaekhwa and the Urgency of Method, published by University of Minnesota Press in 2013, is credited with sparking global interest in Dansaekhwa, a major constellation of abstract paintings produced in South Korea from the 1960s. In 2014, she curated From All Sides: Tansaekhwa and the Urgency of Method, a group show of representative Tansaekhwa artists that was widely acclaimed. She has been cited as Tansaekhwa's most prominent Anglophone scholar.  Kee teaches at the University of Michigan where she is Associate Professor in the History of Art. Her latest book, Models of Integrity: Art and Law in Post-Sixties America, was published February 2019. The book includes discussion of the following artists, among others; Christo and Jeanne-Claude, Gordon Matta-Clark, Tehching Hsieh, Felix Gonzalez-Torres and Sally Mann. Kee is a contributing editor to Artforum, advisory editor to the Oxford Art Journal, editor at large for the Brooklyn Rail, and also sits on the international advisory board of Art History. She has been cited in reference to artists like Zao Wou-ki, Gordon Matta-Clark, and to Park Seobo.

Academic career 
Kee earned her PhD at New York University Institute of Fine Arts. Her supervisor was Shitao scholar Jonathan Hay. Research for her dissertation was supported by an Andrew W. Mellon Foundation Fellowship from the Center for Advanced Study in the Visual Arts, National Gallery of Art, Washington DC. Kee also obtained a JD from Harvard Law School and a BA from Yale College, where she graduated magna cum laude.

Selected publications 

Contemporary Southeast Asian Art: The Right Kind of Trouble, Third Text, vol. 30, 2011 
Contemporary Korean Art: Tansaekhwa and the Urgency of Method, University of Minnesota Press, Minnesota, 2013 
Contemporary Art in Early Colonial Korea: The Self Portraits of Ko Hui-dong, Art History 36:2, p392-417, April 2013 
Towards Law as an Artistic Medium: William E. Jones' Tearoom, Law, Culture and the Humanities, May 27, 2014 
What Scale Affords Us: Sizing Up the World Through Scale, Art Margins 3:2, p3-30, June 2014 
To Scale, co-editor with Emanuele Lugli, Malden: Wiley-Blackwell, 2015 
From All Sides: Tansaekhwa on Abstraction, Blum & Poe, Los Angeles, 2015 
The Measure of the World: Scenes From a Journey to Kaesŏng, Art History 38:2, p364-385, April 2015 
Why Performance in Authoritarian Korea, Tate Papers 23, May 2015 
Orders of Law in the One Year Performances of Tehching Hsieh, American Art (journal), 30, no. 1, Spring 2016 
Art Chasing Law: The Case of Yoko Ono's Rape, Law and Literature (journal), June 2016 
How Art and Law Can Work Together Beyond the Marketplace, with Sonia K. Katyal, Hyperallergic, January 12, 2017 
Modern Art in Late Colonial Korea, a Research Experiment, Modernism/modernity, vol. 25, no. 2, April 2018 
Models of Integrity: Art and Law in Post-Sixties America, University of California Press, February 2019

Selected appearances 

 In 2018, she appeared in Kader Attia's video installation Shifting Borders, commissioned for the Gwangju Biennale.

Fellowships and awards 

 Erwin Panofsky Fellowship, Institute of Fine Arts, New York University, 2003-2008
 Andrew W. Mellon Predoctoral Fellow, Center for Advanced Study in the Visual Arts, National Gallery of Art, 2007

References

External links
Contributions to Artforum by Joan Kee (via Google)
Joan Kee | U-M LSA History of Art
FROM ALL SIDES: TANSAEKHWA ON ABSTRACTION, Curated by Joan Kee, Sept-Nov 2014
Art Encounters Law, The Brooklyn Rail, Guest Critic, March 4, 2016

American art historians
Women art historians
University of Michigan faculty
American women curators
American curators
New York University Institute of Fine Arts alumni
Living people
Harvard Law School alumni
Yale College alumni
Year of birth missing (living people)
American women academics
21st-century American women